Kell is a given name.

People with the given name
 Kell Areskoug (1906–1996), Swedish sprinter
 Kell Brook (born 1986), English professional boxer from Sheffield who fights in the welterweight division
 Kell Osborne (1939–2012), American singer best known as a member of The Primes, a group which would later be known as The Temptations

Fictional characters
 Kell, a character in the online comic strip Kevin and Kell
 Kell, a Klingon ambassador in the Star Trek: The Next Generation episode "The Mind's Eye"
 Kell Maresh, one of the main characters in A Darker Shade of Magic by V.E. Schwab.
 Kell Tainer, a character in the Star Wars Expanded Universe

See also
Kjell